The men's freestyle 84 kg wrestling competition at the 2010 Asian Games in Guangzhou was held on 24 November 2010 at the Huagong Gymnasium.

This freestyle wrestling competition consisted of a single-elimination tournament, with a repechage used to determine the winner of two bronze medals. The two finalists faced off for gold and silver medals. Each wrestler who lost to one of the two finalists moved into the repechage, culminating in a pair of bronze medal matches featuring the semifinal losers each facing the remaining repechage opponent from their half of the bracket.

Each bout consisted of up to three rounds, lasting two minutes apiece. The wrestler who scored more points in each round was the winner of that rounds; the bout finished when one wrestler had won two rounds (and thus the match).

Schedule
All times are China Standard Time (UTC+08:00)

Results

Main bracket

Repechage

Final standing

References
Results, Page 18
FILA Database

Wrestling at the 2010 Asian Games